Zuzana Doležalová (born 12 September 1980 in Děčín) is a Czech snowboarder. She placed 22nd in the women's parallel giant slalom event at the 2010 Winter Olympics.

References

1980 births
Living people
Czech female snowboarders
Olympic snowboarders of the Czech Republic
Snowboarders at the 2010 Winter Olympics
People from Děčín
Sportspeople from the Ústí nad Labem Region